Euphrasia hirtella is a species of flowering plant belonging to the family Orobanchaceae.

Euphrasia hirtella has a vast native range through humid mountains ranges in southern Europe, the Caucasus, the Alborz range in northern Iran, an immensely disjunct area in Siberia, and Himalayas east towards Korea.

References

hirtella
Flora of Europe
Flora of temperate Asia